Monterey Hotel, also known as the Highland Inn, is a historic hotel located at Monterey, Highland County, Virginia, United States. It was built in 1904, and is a three-story, rambling frame building, seven bays long and three bays deep with a two-story ell to the north. It is topped by a hipped roof broken by two cross gables. It features a fine two-story Eastlake porch across an otherwise plain facade.

The hotel was listed on the National Register of Historic Places in 1974. Past guests include Henry Ford, Harvey Firestone, and John Philip Sousa.

References

External links
Highland Inn website

Hotel buildings on the National Register of Historic Places in Virginia
Hotel buildings completed in 1904
Buildings and structures in Highland County, Virginia
National Register of Historic Places in Highland County, Virginia
Virginia Historic Landmarks
1904 establishments in Virginia